St Donats is a village and community in the Vale of Glamorgan in south Wales, located just west of the small town of Llantwit Major. The community includes the village of Marcross and the hamlets of Monknash and East and West Monkton. It is named after the 6th-century saint, Dunwyd, a friend of Saint Cadoc.  It had a population of 732 in 2011.

St Donat's church lies in a depression and is unremarkable from the exterior but contains Stradling family monuments in the Stradling chapel. It is a 12th-century Grade I listed building  with a Grade I listed medieval cross in the churchyard.

The village is primarily known as the location of the 12th century St Donat's Castle, which is now an international boarding school occupied by Atlantic College, the first of the  United World Colleges. Within the castle grounds lies St Donat's Arts Centre.

References

External links 

Villages in the Vale of Glamorgan
Communities in the Vale of Glamorgan